Buttress roots, also known as  plank roots, are large, wide roots on all sides of a shallowly rooted tree. Typically, they are found in nutrient-poor tropical forest soils that may not be very deep. They prevent the tree from falling over (hence the name buttress) while also gathering more nutrients.

Buttresses are tension elements, being larger on the side away from the stress of asymmetrical canopies. The roots may intertwine with buttress roots from other trees and create an intricate mesh, which may help support trees surrounding it. When the roots spread horizontally, they are able to cover a wider area for collecting nutrients. They stay near the upper soil layer because all the main nutrients are found there.

Buttress roots vary greatly in size from barely discernable to many square yards (square meters) of surface. The largest for which there is photographic evidence is a Moreton Bay Fig (Ficus macrophylla) at Fig Tree Pocket (an outlying district of Brisbane, Queensland) which was photographed in 1866 with an adult man. Halfway out the buttress is twice the height of the man. The tree died in 1893 from flood damage. 

The most extensive buttresses are those of the Kapok, or Silk Cotton Tree (Ceiba pentandra), of the Neotropics and tropical Africa.

Notable and historic specimen trees with buttress roots
 Ceiba pentandra of Vieques, Puerto Rico
 Moreton Bay fig (Ficus macrophylla) in Queensland, Australia
 Jackfruit (Artocarpus heterophyllus), India
 Terminalia arjuna, India

References
 

Plant roots
Trees